Weligama is a town on the south coast of Sri Lanka, located in Matara District, Southern Province, Sri Lanka, governed by an Urban Council. The name Weligama, literally means "sandy village" which refers to the area's sandy sweep bay.

History
The main industries are tourism and fishing. Weligama is a popular tourist destination and hosts several boutique hotels including an off shore islet known as Taprobane, which houses a villa constructed by the French Count de Mauny, and is currently owned by Geoffrey Dobbs. It was the birthplace of the scholar monk Weligama Sri Sumangala.

Weligama was significantly affected by the tsunami caused by the 2004 Indian Ocean earthquake, with 15% of the area destroyed, with over 2,200 houses damaged or washed away, and 469 reported deaths.

It is known locally as Kusta Raja Gala or Rock of the Leper King and is thought to represent a king smitten with a skin disease (possibly leprosy "kusta"), who was prompted in a vision to take coconut pulp and water for three months as a cure. When he fulfilled the vision his health was restored, he then commissioned his figure to be carved on the rock commemorating this miraculous cure. This sculpture is believed to be all that is left of the old Agrabodhi Vihara that was located there.

Weligama is recognised for its beeralu lace-making. First introduced by the Portuguese in the 16th century, lace-making has remained a traditional handicraft along the coastal area of Weligama, with a number of households producing crochet and tatting lace.

The area is also famous for its distinct stilt fishermen, who erect a single pole in the chest-deep water on the beach, just few meters off-shore, where they perch on a cross bar and using bamboo fishing rods cast their lines out beyond the surf break to catch small fish.

Gallery

Transport
Weligama is located on the Coastal or Southern Rail Line (connecting Colombo through to Matara), and the A2 highway, connecting Colombo to Weligama.

Demographics
The Weligama Urban Council area is Sinhalese Majority with a large Sri Lankan Muslim population, and a small number of Sri Lankan Tamils. Others including  Indian Tamils, Burgher, Malay.
Source:Government Statistics.lk

Facilities
 Weligama railway station
 Weligama post office

Attractions
 Taprobane Island
 Stilt Fisherman
 Kusta Raja Gala
 Lace-making

Post and telephone
 Sri Lanka 00 94
 Area code 041
 Postal code 81700

See also
 List of towns in Southern Province, Sri Lanka
 List of beaches in Sri Lanka

References

External links 

Populated places in Matara District
Seaside resorts in Sri Lanka